The Unfinished Dance is a 1947 drama film directed by Henry Koster, starring Margaret O'Brien and Cyd Charisse. The story centers around the members of a ballet company, and is a remake of the 1937 French film Ballerina, based on a short story by Paul Morand. It won two awards at the 1948 Locarno International Film Festival.

Plot
Aspiring ballerina Meg Merlin idolizes the head of her dance school, Ariane Bouchet, so much so that she often neglects her own studies just to watch Ariane dance. Only the intervention of kindly Mr. Paneros keeps her from being expelled.

When Meg learns that the "first lady of ballet," Lady Anna La Darina has been hired by the school, Meg is livid at the idea of Ariane being upstaged. She sets out to sabotage Anna's stay, beginning with mischief, like turning off the lights in the middle of a photo session.

Meg is so obsessed in her quest, she even strikes dance student Phyllis Brigham when she dares prefer Anna's talent to Ariane's, earning a formal reprimand. During a performance of "Swan Lake", intending to switch off the lights again, Meg accidentally pulls the lever instead on a trap door. Anna plummets through the stage floor opening, seriously injuring her spine, and is likely never to dance again.

Phyllis and Josie have a hunch that Meg is responsible, so they blackmail her. Worse yet, Meg discovers that Ariane is self-indulgent, focusing more on clothing and fame; whereas, Anna is generous and kind, coming back to the school to advise the students as best she can.
 
Meg becomes more and more frightened and riddled with guilt regarding Anna's plight. Mr. Paneros, decides to talk to Anna and inadvertently reveals Meg's involvement regarding her accident.  When Anna learns the truth, she soon forgives her. Meg now has a new idol.

Cast
 Margaret O'Brien as "Meg" Merlin
 Cyd Charisse as Mlle. Ariane Bouchet
 Karin Booth as Lady Anna La Darina
 Danny Thomas as Mr. Paneros
 Esther Dale as Olga
 Thurston Hall as Mr. Ronsell
 Harry Hayden as Murphy
 Mary Eleanor Donahue as Josie
 Connie Cornell as Phyllis
 Ruth Brady as Miss Merlin
 Charles Bradstreet as Fred Carleton
 Ann Codee as Mme. Borodin
 Gregory Gay as Jacques Lacoste

Reception
According to MGM records, the film earned $1,129,000 in the U.S. and Canada and $1,174,000 in other markets, but because of its high cost, it recorded a loss of $1,797,000. It was the first movie produced by Joe Pasternak at MGM to lose money.

References

External links
 
 

1947 films
1940s musical comedy-drama films
American musical comedy-drama films
American remakes of French films
Films about ballet
Films based on works by Paul Morand
Films directed by Henry Koster
Films produced by Joe Pasternak
Films scored by Herbert Stothart
Films set in New York City
Metro-Goldwyn-Mayer films
1947 comedy films
1947 drama films
1940s American films